Plamen Donev (born May 18, 1956) is a former Bulgarian footballer and currently manager.

On 16 October 2017, Donev was appointed as caretaker manager of Dunav Ruse following the departure of Veselin Velikov.

References 

Bulgarian football managers
PFC Svetkavitsa managers
1956 births
Living people
People from Targovishte